The 1999 Paris–Tours was the 93rd edition of the Paris–Tours cycle race and was held on 3 October 1999. The race started in Saint-Arnoult-en-Yvelines and finished in Tours. The race was won by Marc Wauters of the Rabobank team.

General classification

References

1999 in French sport
1999
Paris-Tours
October 1999 sports events in Europe
1999 in road cycling